Arturo Gériz (born 24 July 1964) is a Spanish former cyclist. He competed in the team time trial at the 1988 Summer Olympics.

References

External links
 

1964 births
Living people
Spanish male cyclists
Olympic cyclists of Spain
Cyclists at the 1988 Summer Olympics
People from Soria
Sportspeople from the Province of Soria
Cyclists from Castile and León